Horichia is a monotypic genus of orchid in the subtribe Stanhopeinae. Its only species is Horichia dressleri, which is endemic to Panama.

References

Monotypic Epidendroideae genera
Stanhopeinae genera
Orchids of Panama
Endemic flora of Panama
Stanhopeinae